Parascepsis is a genus of moths in the subfamily Arctiinae. It contains the single species Parascepsis solox, which is found in the Amazon region.

References

Natural History Museum Lepidoptera generic names catalog

Arctiinae